The 1985 Stanford Cardinal baseball team represented Stanford University in the 1985 NCAA Division I baseball season. The Cardinal played their home games at Sunken Diamond. The team was coached by Mark Marquess in his 9th year at Stanford.

The Cardinal won the Pacific-10 Conference South Division and the West I Regional to advanced to the College World Series, where they were defeated by the Arkansas Razorbacks.

Roster

Schedule 

! style="" | Regular Season
|- valign="top" 

|- align="center" bgcolor="#ccffcc"
| 1 || January 29 ||  || Sunken Diamond • Stanford, California || 5–1 || 1–0 || –
|- align="center" bgcolor="#ffcccc"
| 2 || January 31 || at  || Titan Field • Fullerton, California || 7–13 || 1–1 || –
|-

|- align="center" bgcolor="#ccffcc"
| 3 || February 1 || at Cal State Fullerton || Titan Field • Fullerton, California || 6–3 || 2–1 || –
|- align="center" bgcolor="#ccffcc"
| 4 || February 5 || at Cal State Fullerton || Titan Field • Fullerton, California || 6–4 || 3–1 || –
|- align="center" bgcolor="#ccffcc"
| 5 || February 9 ||  || Sunken Diamond • Stanford, California || 3–2 || 4–1 || –
|- align="center" bgcolor="#ffcccc"
| 6 || February 10 || Santa Clara || Sunken Diamond • Stanford, California || 5–9 || 4–2 || –
|- align="center" bgcolor="#ccffcc"
| 7 || February 12 ||  || Sunken Diamond • Stanford, California || 18–3 || 5–2 || –
|- align="center" bgcolor="#ccffcc"
| 8 || February 15 || at  || Pete Beiden Field at Bob Bennett Stadium • Fresno, California || 8–4 || 6–2 || –
|- align="center" bgcolor="#ffcccc"
| 9 || February 16 || at Fresno State || Unknown • Hayward, California || 2–7 || 6–3 || –
|- align="center" bgcolor="#ccffcc"
| 10 || February 17 || Fresno State || Sunken Diamond • Stanford, California || 9–3 || 7–3 || –
|- align="center" bgcolor="#ccffcc"
| 11 || February 18 || Fresno State || Sunken Diamond • Stanford, California || 10–6 || 8–3 || –
|- align="center" bgcolor="#ccffcc"
| 12 || February 22 || at  || San Jose Municipal Stadium • San Jose, California || 4–0 || 9–3 || –
|- align="center" bgcolor="#ccffcc"
| 13 || February 23 || San Jose State || Sunken Diamond • Stanford, California || 7–3 || 10–3 || –
|- align="center" bgcolor="#ccffcc"
| 14 || February 23 || San Jose State || Sunken Diamond • Stanford, California || 12–6 || 11–3 || –
|- align="center" bgcolor="#ccffcc"
| 15 || February 26 ||  || Sunken Diamond • Stanford, California || 7–2 || 12–3 || –
|- align="center" bgcolor="#ffcccc"
| 16 || February 27 ||  || Sunken Diamond • Stanford, California || 4–5 || 12–4 || –
|-

|- align="center" bgcolor="#ccffcc"
| 17 || March 1 ||  || Sunken Diamond • Stanford, California || 9–8 || 13–4 || 1–0
|- align="center" bgcolor="#ccffcc"
| 18 || March 2 || Arizona State || Sunken Diamond • Stanford, California || 11–7 || 14–4 || 2–0
|- align="center" bgcolor="#ccffcc"
| 19 || March 3 || Arizona State || Sunken Diamond • Stanford, California || 10–7 || 15–4 || 3–0
|- align="center" bgcolor="#ccffcc"
| 20 || March 8 || at  || Jackie Robinson Stadium • Los Angeles, California || 5–2 || 16–4 || 4–0
|- align="center" bgcolor="#ccffcc"
| 21 || March 9 || at UCLA || Jackie Robinson Stadium • Los Angeles, California || 3–2 || 17–4 || 5–0
|- align="center" bgcolor="#ccffcc"
| 22 || March 10 || at UCLA || Jackie Robinson Stadium • Los Angeles, California || 9–0 || 18–4 || 6–0
|- align="center" bgcolor="#ffcccc"
| 23 || March 15 ||  || Sunken Diamond • Stanford, California || 5–6 || 18–5 || 6–1
|- align="center" bgcolor="#ccffcc"
| 24 || March 16 || Southern California || Sunken Diamond • Stanford, California || 15–4 || 19–5 || 7–1
|- align="center" bgcolor="#ccffcc"
| 25 || March 17 || Southern California || Sunken Diamond • Stanford, California || 15–5 || 20–5 || 8–1
|- align="center" bgcolor="#ccffcc"
| 26 || March 23 || at Arizona || Jerry Kindall Field at Frank Sancet Stadium • Tucson, Arizona || 20–5 || 21–5 || 9–1
|- align="center" bgcolor="#ccffcc"
| 27 || March 23 || at Arizona || Jerry Kindall Field at Frank Sancet Stadium • Tucson, Arizona || 10–6 || 22–5 || 10–1
|- align="center" bgcolor="#ffcccc"
| 28 || March 24 || at Arizona || Jerry Kindall Field at Frank Sancet Stadium • Tucson, Arizona || 8–13 || 22–6 || 10–2
|- align="center" bgcolor="#ffcccc"
| 29 || March 28 || at  || Caesar Uyesaka Stadium • Santa Barbara, California || 2–4 || 22–7 || 10–2
|-

|- align="center" bgcolor="#ccffcc"
| 30 || April 2 || at San Jose State || San Jose Municipal Stadium • San Jose, California || 8–5 || 23–7 || 10–2
|- align="center" bgcolor="#ccffcc"
| 31 || April 4 || at  || Evans Diamond • Berkeley, California || 7–1 || 24–7 || 11–2
|- align="center" bgcolor="#ccffcc"
| 32 || April 5 || California || Sunken Diamond • Stanford, California || 9–1 || 25–7 || 12–2
|- align="center" bgcolor="#ffcccc"
| 33 || April 6 || at California || Evans Diamond • Berkeley, California || 8–10 || 25–8 || 12–3
|- align="center" bgcolor="#ccffcc"
| 34 || April 9 || at  || Unknown • Davis, California || 20–5 || 26–8 || 12–3
|- align="center" bgcolor="#ffcccc"
| 35 || April 12 || Arizona || Sunken Diamond • Stanford, California || 5–7 || 26–9 || 12–4
|- align="center" bgcolor="#ccffcc"
| 36 || April 13 || Arizona || Sunken Diamond • Stanford, California || 20–8 || 27–9 || 13–4
|- align="center" bgcolor="#ccffcc"
| 37 || April 13 || Arizona || Sunken Diamond • Stanford, California || 11–1 || 28–9 || 14–4
|- align="center" bgcolor="#ffcccc"
| 38 || April 19 || UCLA || Sunken Diamond • Stanford, California || 4–3 || 29–9 || 15–4
|- align="center" bgcolor="#ffcccc"
| 39 || April 20 || UCLA || Sunken Diamond • Stanford, California || 6–9 || 29–10 || 15–5
|- align="center" bgcolor="#ccffcc"
| 40 || April 21 || UCLA || Sunken Diamond • Stanford, California || 9–8 || 30–10 || 16–5
|- align="center" bgcolor="#ccffcc"
| 41 || April 22 || at Pacific || Billy Hebert Field • Stockton, California || 5–4 || 31–10 || 16–5
|- align="center" bgcolor="#ccffcc"
| 42 || April 26 || at Southern California || Dedeaux Field • Los Angeles, California || 16–1 || 32–10 || 17–5
|- align="center" bgcolor="#ccffcc"
| 43 || April 27 || at Southern California || Dedeaux Field • Los Angeles, California || 13–9 || 33–10 || 18–5
|- align="center" bgcolor="#ccffcc"
| 44 || April 28 || at Southern California || Dedeaux Field • Los Angeles, California || 14–5 || 34–10 || 19–5
|- align="center" bgcolor="#ccffcc"
| 45 || April 30 || at Santa Clara || Buck Shaw Stadium • Santa Clara, California || 11–8 || 35–10 || 19–5
|-

|- align="center" bgcolor="#ccffcc"
| 46 || May 3 || at Arizona State || Packard Stadium • Tempe, Arizona || 15–8 || 36–10 || 20–5
|- align="center" bgcolor="#ffcccc"
| 47 || May 4 || at Arizona State || Packard Stadium • Tempe, Arizona || 8–13 || 36–11 || 20–6
|- align="center" bgcolor="#ccffcc"
| 48 || May 5 || at Arizona State || Packard Stadium • Tempe, Arizona || 15–10 || 37–11 || 21–6
|- align="center" bgcolor="#ccffcc"
| 49 || May 7 || at Saint Mary's || Louis Guisto Field • Moraga, California || 14–7 || 38–11 || 21–6
|- align="center" bgcolor="#ccffcc"
| 50 || May 8 ||  || Sunken Diamond • Stanford, California || 12–0 || 39–11 || 21–6
|- align="center" bgcolor="#ccffcc"
| 51 || May 9 ||  || Sunken Diamond • Stanford, California || 15–0 || 40–11 || 21–6
|- align="center" bgcolor="#ccffcc"
| 52 || May 14 || at Santa Clara || Stephen Schott Stadium • Santa Clara, California || 17–7 || 41–11 || 21–6
|- align="center" bgcolor="#ccffcc"
| 53 || May 17 || California || Sunken Diamond • Stanford, California || 7–1 || 42–11 || 22–6
|- align="center" bgcolor="#ccffcc"
| 54 || May 18 || at California || Evans Diamond • Berkeley, California || 5–4 || 43–11 || 23–6
|- align="center" bgcolor="#ffcccc"
| 55 || May 19 || California || Sunken Diamond • Stanford, California || 6–12 || 43–12 || 23–7
|-

|-
|-
! style="" | Postseason
|- valign="top"

|- align="center" bgcolor="#ccffcc"
| 56 || May 24 ||  || Sunken Diamond • Stanford, California || 17–3 || 44–12 || 23–7
|- align="center" bgcolor="#ccffcc"
| 57 || May 25 ||  || Sunken Diamond • Stanford, California || 9–8 || 45–12 || 23–7
|- align="center" bgcolor="#ffcccc"
| 58 || May 26 ||  || Sunken Diamond • Stanford, California || 1–5 || 45–13 || 23–7
|- align="center" bgcolor="#ccffcc"
| 59 || May 27 || Pepperdine || Sunken Diamond • Stanford, California || 7–1 || 46–13 || 23–7
|-

|- align="center" bgcolor="#ffcccc"
| 60 || June 1 || vs Miami (FL) || Johnny Rosenblatt Stadium • Omaha, Nebraska || 3–17 || 46–14 || 23–7
|- align="center" bgcolor="#ccffcc"
| 61 || June 2 || vs Arizona || Johnny Rosenblatt Stadium • Omaha, Nebraska || 9–2 || 47–14 || 23–7
|- align="center" bgcolor="#ffcccc"
| 62 || June 6 || vs  || Johnny Rosenblatt Stadium • Omaha, Nebraska || 4–10 || 47–15 || 23–7
|-

Awards and honors 
Jeff Ballard
 All-Pac-10 South Division
 Third Team All-American Baseball America

Mark Davis
 All-Pac-10 South Division

Rick Lundblade
 Pac-10 Conference South Division Player of the Year
 All-Pac-10 South Division
 Second Team All-American Baseball America

Jack McDowell
 Co-Freshman of the Year Baseball America

Pete Stanicek
 All-Pac-10 South Division

John Verducci
 All-Pac-10 South Division

References 

Stanford Cardinal baseball seasons
Stanford Cardinal baseball
College World Series seasons
Stanford
Pac-12 Conference baseball champion seasons